The Rover Boys, or The Rover Boys Series for Young Americans, was a popular juvenile series written by Arthur M. Winfield, a pseudonym for Edward Stratemeyer. Thirty titles were published between 1899 and 1926 and the books remained in print for years afterward.

The original Rover Boys were brothers Tom, Sam, and Dick Rover, the sons of wealthy widower Anderson Rover, who entrusted his brother and sister-in-law, Randolph and Martha, with the rearing of the boys. As the series progressed the brothers became smitten with Dora Stanhope and Nellie and Grace Laning, the daughter and nieces of a wealthy widow. 

The Rover boys' children (Fred, son of Sam Rover; Jack, son of Dick; Andy and Randy, twin sons of Tom) became the main characters of the "second series" that began with Volume 21, The Rover Boys at Colby Hall, published in 1917. The elder Rovers continued making appearances in the second series.

Additionally, there was a related Putnam Hall series of six books that featured other characters from the first Rovers series, although the Rovers themselves do not appear.

The Rovers were students at a military boarding school: adventurous, prank-playing, flirtatious, and often unchaperoned adolescents who were frequently causing mischief for authorities, as well as for criminals. The series often incorporated modern technology of the era, such as the automobile, airplanes (The Rover Boys in the Air) and news events, such as World War I.

The earliest volumes focused on the boys' travel adventures, but later stories were filled with mystery and suspense.

Publishers
From 1899 to 1906 The Mershon Co. published volumes 1 through 11; from 1906 to 1907 Chatterton-Peck Co. published volumes 1 through 11. Starting in 1907 Grosset & Dunlap began publishing the Rover Boys, eventually printing all 30 volumes. They published the series through at least the 1930s. Starting in the 1940s Whitman Publishing reprinted volumes 1, 2, 7, 8, 10, 11, 13 and 14.

Legacy

More than a million Rover Boys books were sold, and the titles remained in print by Grosset & Dunlap and later Whitman for years after the final title was published. The most commonly encountered are the green and brown cover editions published by Grosset & Dunlap during the 1910s and 1920s. While there are better-known and longer-running juvenile series such as The Hardy Boys, Nancy Drew, and Tom Swift, the Rovers were very successful and influential. They established the template for all later Stratemeyer Syndicate series. It was Stratemeyer's first series, and one of his favorites. Stratemeyer did all of the writing himself, rather than hiring ghostwriters.
 The Rover Boys were parodied in a 1942 Warner Brothers Merrie Melodies cartoon as The Dover Boys, subtitled "The Rivals of Roquefort Hall" (as opposed to Colby, both terms being cheeses). The cartoon was directed by Chuck Jones. The characters from this Rovers parody would later appear in two episodes of Animaniacs (Frontier Slappy and Magic Time) and its 1999 series finale Wakko's Wish, as well as the 1996 movie Space Jam.
In the 1951 detective novel The Way Some People Die by Ross MacDonald, a police lieutenant accuses protagonist Lew Archer of running “a murder investigation as a one-man show.” He mocks Archer by asking if he has been “[r]eading The Rover Boys at Hollywood and Vine.”
 In the 1952 movie Macao starring Robert Mitchum and Jane Russell, the Mitchum character, Nick Cochran asks “are the Rover Boys still here” referring to 2 thugs sent to find him.
 The 18th episode of the first season (1953) of The Adventures of Ozzie and Harriet is titled "Rover Boys" and features a narrative driven by a disagreement between Ozzie and his neighbor Thorny concerning the plot of a Rover Boys story.
 In the 1955 MGM musical It's Always Fair Weather, there are two references to The Rover Boys. The first is in the beginning of the movie when a bartender exclaims, "Well if it isn't the Rover Boys" as the three main characters walk into his bar. The second is toward the end of the movie. While trying to evade thugs, the character named Ted borrows a jacket which has "The Rover Boys" embroidered on the back.
 In 1956 a Canadian vocal group named after the Rover Boys had a Top 20 single with the school-themed "Graduation Day".
 The names Tom, Sam, and Dick Rover are mentioned by Scout in Harper Lee's 1960 novel To Kill a Mockingbird in reference to a game of pretend in which Dill, Jem, and Scout all had good parts.
 In a 1965 episode of I Spy called "Carry Me Back To Old Tsing-Tao", Scotty referred to the three money-hungry sons-in-law of an aged Chinese criminal mastermind as "The Rover Boys" by saying, "...Now can the Rover Boys be far behind?"
 The Rover Boys books were mentioned in the 1966 supernatural soap opera Dark Shadows (episode 38) where the governess Victoria Winters was searching for the books in the basement of the old mansion for her charge David Collins.
 In the eighth season of The Andy Griffith Show, in a 1967 episode titled "The Tape Recorder," the bank robber character Eddie Blake complains that his luck was he had to run into the "Rover Boys" when Opie and Arnold ask him to confess his crime because they secretly recorded him in his cell revealing the location of the stolen money.

Titles

 The Rover Boys at School, or, The Cadets of Putnam Hall - 1899
 The Rover Boys on the Ocean, or, A Chase for a Fortune - 1899
 The Rover Boys in the Jungle, or, Stirring Adventures in Africa - 1899
 The Rover Boys Out West, or, The Search for a Lost Mine - 1900
 The Rover Boys on the Great Lakes, or, The Secret of the Island Cave - 1901
 The Rover Boys in the Mountains, or, A Hunt for Fun and Fortune- 1902
 The Rover Boys on Land and Sea, or, The Crusoes of Seven Islands - 1903
 The Rover Boys in Camp, or, The Rivals of Pine Island - 1904
 The Rover Boys on the River, or, The Search for the Missing Houseboat - 1905
 The Rover Boys on the Plains, or, The Mystery of Red Rock Ranch - 1906
 The Rover Boys in Southern Waters, or, The Deserted Steam Yacht - 1907
 The Rover Boys on the Farm, or, Last Days at Putnam Hall - 1908
 The Rover Boys on Treasure Isle, or, The Strange Cruise of the Steam Yacht - 1909
 The Rover Boys at College, or, The Right Roads and the Wrong - 1910
 The Rover Boys Down East, or, The Struggle for the Stanhope Fortune - 1911
 The Rover Boys in the Air, or, From College Campus to the Clouds - 1912
 The Rover Boys in New York, or, Saving their Father's Honor - 1913
 The Rover Boys in Alaska, or, Lost in the Fields of Ice - 1914
 The Rover Boys in Business, or, The Case of the Missing Bonds - 1915
 The Rover Boys on a Tour, or, Last Days at Brill College - 1916

Second series
 The Rover Boys at Colby Hall, or, The Struggles of the Young Cadets - 1917 
 The Rover Boys on Snowshoe Island, or, The Old Lumberman's Treasure Box - 1918 
 The Rover Boys Under Canvas, or, The Mystery of the Wrecked Submarine - 1919 
 The Rover Boys on a Hunt, or, The Mysterious House in the Woods - 1920 
 The Rover Boys in the Land of Luck, or, Stirring Adventures in the Oil Fields - 1921 
 The Rover Boys at Big Horn Ranch, or, The Cowboys' Big Roundup - 1922 
 The Rover Boys at Big Bear Lake, or, The Camps of the Rival Cadets - 1923 
 The Rover Boys Shipwrecked, or, A Thrilling Hunt for Pirates Gold - 1924 
 The Rover Boys on Sunset Trail, or, The Old Miner's Mysterious Message - 1925 
 The Rover Boys Winning a Fortune, or, Strenuous Days Ashore and Afloat - 1926

Putnam Hall series
 The Putnam Hall Cadets, or, Good Times In School and Out - 1901
 The Putnam Hall Rivals, or, Fun and Sport Afloat and Ashore - 1906
 The Putnam Hall Champions, or, Bound to Win Out - 1908
 The Putnam Hall Rebellion, or, The Rival Runaways - 1909
 The Putnam Hall Encampment, or, The Secret of the Old Mill - 1910
 The Putnam Hall Mystery, or, The School Chums Strange Discovery - 1911

Some of these books are available for download free at Project Gutenberg.

Main characters

First series
Dick, Tom and Sam Rover *
Anderson, Randolph and Martha Rover *
Lucy Stanhope
Mary and John Laning
Captain Victor Putnam
Martin Harris
Jack Wumble
Jake Shaggam
Ike Furner
Minnie Sanderson *
Dora Stanhope *
Nellie and Grace Laning *
Barton Pelter
Hans Mueller *
Frank Harrington
Fred Garrison *
Larry Colby *
Harry Blossom
Bart Conners
George Granbury
William "Tubby" Philander Tubbs
John "Songbird" Powell *
Will "Spud" Jackson
Stanley Browne
Bob Grimes
Buddy Girk
Arnold Baxter
Andy Jimson
Dan Baxter
John "Mumps" Fenwick
Josiah Crabtree *
Jasper Grinder
Bill Goss
Jim Caven
Jack Ness *
Alexander Pop *
Lew Flapp
Sack Todd
Gasper Pold
Solly Jackson
Tad Sobber
Sid Merrick
Jerry Koswell
Bart Larkspur
Dudd Flockley
Jesse Pelter

Second series
Jack and Martha Rover
Andy and Randy Rover
Mary and Fred Rover
May Powell
Ruth Stevenson
Annie Larkins
Alice Strobell
Colonel Laurence Colby (see Larry Colby in First Series)
Phil Franklin
Barney Stevenson
Fred Stevenson
Giford Garrison
Dick "Spouter" Powell
Dan Soppinger
Will "Fatty" Hendry
Walt Baxter
Ned Lowe
Asa Lemm
Nappy Martell
Slogwell "Slugger" Brown, Jr.
Slogwell Brown
Henry "Codfish" Stowell
Bill Glutts
Gabe Werner
Tommy Flanders
Snopper Duke
Jed Wallop
Carson Davenport
Joe Sedley
Nat Durgin
Antonino "Lefty" Ditini
"Black" Ronumbo
Nelson Martell
Ken Greene

References

External links

Book series introduced in 1899
Stratemeyer Syndicate
American children's novels
Juvenile series
Fictional families
Fictional trios
Works about brothers
Literary characters introduced in 1899
Male characters in literature
Works published under a pseudonym
Grosset & Dunlap books